Coleophora jaculatoria is a moth of the family Coleophoridae. It is found in Shaanxi, China.

References
 , 1999: Studies on the Chinese Coleophoridae (Lepidoptera): The Coleophora follicularis group, with descriptions of three new species. Acta Entomologica Sinica 42 (4): 411-417.

jaculatoria
Moths of Asia
Moths described in 1999